Jorge Pina may refer to:

 Jorge Pina (fencer), Spanish sabre fencer
 Jorge Pina (footballer), Spanish footballer
 Jorge Pina (athlete), Portuguese paralympic marathon runner, see Portugal at the 2016 Summer Paralympics

See also
Jorge Pina Cabral, a Portuguese bishop